Anne Rinse Vermeer (12 December 1916 – 26 July 2018) was a Dutch politician of the Labour Party (PvdA).

Decorations

References

External links
Official

  Drs. A.R. (Anne) Vermeer Parlement & Politiek
  Drs. A.R. Vermeer (PvdA) Eerste Kamer der Staten-Generaal

 
 

 
 

1916 births
2018 deaths
Mayors in Utrecht (province)
People from Amersfoort
Members of the House of Representatives (Netherlands)
Members of the Senate (Netherlands)
Members of the Provincial-Executive of Gelderland
Members of the Provincial Council of Gelderland
Labour Party (Netherlands) politicians
Dutch economists
Dutch educators
Dutch centenarians
Dutch atheists
Dutch humanists
Men centenarians
Erasmus University Rotterdam alumni
Knights of the Order of the Netherlands Lion
Commanders of the Order of Orange-Nassau
People from Tiel
People from Arnhem